Kasonga Airport  was a rural airstrip near Kasonga in Kasaï-Central Province, Democratic Republic of the Congo.

See also

Transport in the Democratic Republic of the Congo
List of airports in the Democratic Republic of the Congo

References

External links
OpenStreetMap - Kasonga
OurAirports - Kasonga
FallingRain - Kasonga Airport

Defunct airports
Airports in Kasaï-Central